Seikko Aarne Väinämö Eskola (b. 13 September 1933 in Riihimäki) is a Finnish historian and debater. Eskola was 1974–1997 assistant professor in general history at Tampere University. He was editor in chief for the cultural journal Kanava 1979–1993.

Amongst his works are to be found the journalistic historical work Suomen kysymys ja Ruotsin mielipide (1965), which contains a study of Swedish opinions about the status of Finland during 1914–1917, and Yhdysvaltain lehdistö ja Suomen kriisi (1974), which is about the American press and the Finnish crisis, and Kreikka, Englanti ja Yhdysvallat 1944–1953 (1971). He became professor honoris causa in 1993.

References

External links
http://seikkoeskola.blogspot.com/

1933 births
20th-century Finnish historians
Living people
People from Riihimäki